The Grand Street and Newtown Railroad was a street railway company in the U.S. state of New York. The company operated two lines - the Grand Street Line from Williamsburg to Elmhurst and the Meeker Avenue Line from Williamsburg to West Maspeth.

The company was chartered in 1859. The Brooklyn City Rail Road leased it on May 1, 1890.

References

Streetcar lines in Brooklyn
Streetcar lines in Queens, New York
Predecessors of the Brooklyn–Manhattan Transit Corporation
Defunct New York (state) railroads
1859 establishments in New York (state)
Railway companies established in 1859
Railway companies disestablished in 1890